Erie Railroad Depot, Erie Railroad Station or Erie Depot was the terminal station for the Erie Railroad in Rochester, New York, designed by George E. Archer, the railroad's architect.

History
The station opened in 1887 between the Genesee River and Exchange Street on the south side of Court Street. It was one of the Erie's few electrified railroad stations, and was one of the first stations to provide electric commuter services in 1907. The station was of Victorian design and included a clock tower. It had two tracks and a fully covered platform. The Erie Railroad tracks proceeded south along the east side of the river.

In 1905 the Lehigh Valley Railroad station opened directly across the Genesee River from the Erie Depot. Following the economically difficult years of the Great Depression, passenger service terminated in 1941. The station was demolished in 1942 although the tracks remained for a while after and continued to be used by the Erie Railroad through the 1950s. The area has become a parking lot for the Blue Cross Arena.

Gallery

See also
Rochester & Genesee Valley Railroad Museum
Court Street Bridge (Genesee River)

References

Railway stations in Rochester, New York
Former Erie Railroad stations
Railway stations in Monroe County, New York
Railway stations in the United States opened in 1887
Demolished railway stations in the United States
Railway stations closed in 1941
1887 establishments in New York (state)
1941 disestablishments in New York (state)
Buildings and structures demolished in 1947